We Are Superhuman  (stylized in all caps as NCT #127 WE ARE SUPERHUMAN) is the fourth Korean extended play (fifth overall) by South Korean boy band NCT 127. Originally confirmed concurrently during the release of their first Japanese studio album Awaken earlier in April 2019, it was released on May 24, 2019 by SM Entertainment and Capitol Music Group. Adrian McKinnon, Tak, 1 Take, Social House, Vedo, Léon Paul Palmen, Jihad Rahmouni, Roel Donk, Sean Machum, Gaelen Whittemore, Michael Foster, Rykeyz, and others contributed both lyrics and production. Described as an electro-pop record with R&B influence, the extended play saw a "stylistic" shift from the unit's usual "experimental hip hop" direction to a "futuristic, funkier" approach.

Upon its release, the "genre-fusing" extended play received positive reviews from music critics for its "catchy pop and pitch-perfect production value." We Are Superhuman went on to achieve commercial success both domestically and internationally, being the group's fourth chart-topper on the Gaon Album Chart and their second to be Platinum-certified by KMCA. It also debuted and peaked at number eleven and number sixty-four on the Billboard 200 chart and the Canadian Albums Chart, surpassing their previous achievement on the former and being their first entry on the latter chart. The extended play also made its debut on several component digital charts as well.

Two singles were released for the EP, including the lead single "Superhuman" on May 24, 2019 and the second single "Highway to Heaven" on July 18, 2019. The lead single went on to achieve moderate success in their native country, being their third entry on the Gaon Digital Chart. To promote the album, the group appeared and performed on several television shows such as Good Morning America and The Late Late Show with James Corden, further embarking on their first expanded world tour Neo City – The Origin, starting from January 2019.

Background and release
The song for pre-single track "Highway to Heaven" was released as a pre-release single on May 14, 2019, alongside its music video.

Promotion
The band debuted "Superhuman" in a performance on Good Morning America on April 18. They are the third Korean act to appear on the program.

Commercial performance
We Are Superhuman debuted at number 11 on the US Billboard 200 with 27,000 equivalent album units (with 25,000 being traditional sales), becoming NCT 127's highest-charting album in the chart; they became the second highest charting K-pop group in the chart. The EP also debuted atop the World Albums chart, becoming the group's second number one since Limitless in 2017.  Meanwhile, the lead track "Superhuman" debuted at number three on the World Digital Song Sales chart, with one thousand downloads sold, becoming the group's seventh top-ten song on the chart.

In Japan, the EP debuted at the sixth spot of Oricon's Weekly Digital Albums with 829 downloads. It debuted in the Weekly Albums Chart at number six with 7,265 copies a week later.

Reception

Track listing

Notes
 "Fool" and "Outro: We Are 127" are stylized in all caps.

Charts

Weekly charts

Year-end charts

Certifications and sales figures

Release history

See also
List of Gaon Album Chart number ones of 2019
List of K-pop albums on the Billboard charts

References

External links
 
 
 

2019 EPs
Korean-language EPs
NCT 127 albums
SM Entertainment EPs
IRiver EPs